Kalingalan Caluang, officially the Municipality of Kalingalan Caluang (Tausūg: Kawman sin Kalingalan Caluang), is a 5th class municipality in the province of Sulu, Philippines. According to the 2020 census, it has a population of 39,549 people.

History 
Kalingalan Caluang was created on December 6, 1975, by Presidential Decree No. 838 from the barangays of Luuk, Sulu.

Geography

Barangays
Kalingalan Caluang is politically subdivided into 9 barangays.
 Kambing
 Kanlagay
 Karungdong (Poblacion)
 Masjid Bayle
 Masjid Punjungan
 Pang
 Pangdan Pangdan
 Pitogo
 Tunggol

Climate

Demographics

Economy

References

External links
Kalingalan Caluang Profile at PhilAtlas.com
[ Philippine Standard Geographic Code]
Kalingalan Caluang Profile at the DTI Cities and Municipalities Competitive Index
Philippine Census Information
Local Governance Performance Management System

Municipalities of Sulu
Establishments by Philippine presidential decree